Ian Anthony Trewhella, AM is an Australian Paralympic medallist in athletics and archery, who has won four medals at two Paralaympics.

Personal

In 1961, Trewhella became a quadriplegic due to an illness. He worked in the Australian Public Service for 27 years, 17 years of which was with the Department of Prime Minister and Cabinet. In 1984, he established the Wheelchair Factory in Canberra.

He has been an advocate for people with a disability in Canberra and surrounding regions, having served on the boards and committees of many disability-related organisations. He provides advice to health professions and families on people living with quadriplegia.

In 1992, he became a Member of the Order of Australia due to volunteer service to people with disabilities in the fields of sport, recreation and welfare.

Paralympic Games

At the 1980 Arnhem Paralympics, he won silver medals in the  Men's archery short metric round tetraplegic and men's athletics Pentathlon 1B events.  At the 1984 New York/Stoke Mandeville Paralympics, he won two silver medals in archery in the Men's Double Advanced Metric Round Tetraplegic and Men's Short metric round team 1A–6 events.

References

External links
 

Archers at the 1980 Summer Paralympics
Athletes (track and field) at the 1980 Summer Paralympics
Archers at the 1984 Summer Paralympics
Paralympic silver medalists for Australia
Wheelchair category Paralympic competitors
Sportsmen from the Australian Capital Territory
People with tetraplegia
Members of the Order of Australia
Year of birth missing (living people)
Living people
Medalists at the 1980 Summer Paralympics
Medalists at the 1984 Summer Paralympics
Australian male archers
Paralympic medalists in athletics (track and field)
Paralympic medalists in archery
Paralympic archers of Australia
Paralympic athletes of Australia